The Mediterranean Universities Union (UNIMED) consists of 149 universities from 24 countries  of the Mediterranean basin (or that have a specific interest in the Mediterranean region). The association has its head office in Rome.

Board 
 President: Prof. Francisco Matte Bon, Rector Università degli Studi Internazionali di Roma, UNINT (Italy)
 Vice Presidents: Université Saint Esprit de Kaslik (Lebanon) and Universidad de Barcelona (Spain)
 Secretary General: Prof. Hmaid Ben Aziza (Tunisia)

UNIMED member universities

References

External links
 UNIMED - official website

Higher education organisations based in Europe
International college and university associations and consortia
Organisations based in Rome